The Ngarlawongga, or more properly Ngarla, were an Aboriginal Australian people of the inland Mid West region of Western Australia. They are not to be confused with the Ngarla who live on the coast.

Country
The Ngarlawongga were the people who inhabited the area of the headwaters of the Ashburton and Gascoyne rivers, going south to the vicinity of the Three Rivers and Mulgul. Their eastern extension ran to Ilgarari.

On the Ngarlawongga's boundaries, to their immediate north were the Mandara, then, running clockwise, the Wirdinya north-east, followed by the Wardal, and the Madoitja south/southeast and the Watjarri to their south-west. The Ninanu lay on their western flank, below the northwestern Inawongga.

People
The Australian writer Katharine Susannah Prichard's novel of interracial love, Coonardoo (1929), was written directly after her stay among the Ngarlawongga while resident on McGuire's pastoral station which was run by local aboriginals. She called them Gnarler and found the Ngarlawongga both 'poetic' and 'naive'.

Alternative names
 Ngalawongga.
 Nalawonga.
 Ngarla-warngga.
 "Southern Pad'ima" Ngalawonga.
 Ngarla. (to be distinguished from the Ngarla of the De Grey River).

Notes

Citations

Sources

Aboriginal peoples of Western Australia